Johann "John" Fellenz (June 23, 1833December 16, 1896) was a German American immigrant, building contractor, and Wisconsin pioneer.  He was a member of the Wisconsin State Assembly, representing the southwest side of the city of Milwaukee for five terms.  He was also one of the contractors for the construction of the Winnebago Mental Health Institute.

Biography
Fellenz was born in the municipality of Bengel, in what's now western Germany, in June 1833. Sources have differed on the exact date.  At the time of his birth, this area was the Rhine Province of the Kingdom of Prussia.  As a child, he emigrated to the United States with his parents and settled in the town of Farmington, Washington County, in the Wisconsin Territory, in 1847.  At age 18, he moved to the city of Milwaukee, where he worked as a carpenter and builder.

He was one of the earliest settlers in the southwest side of the city of Milwaukee, in what was the 8th ward for most of his life.  He was active throughout his life with the Democratic Party of Wisconsin.  He was elected to three consecutive terms in the Wisconsin State Assembly in 1867, 1868, and 1869, running on the Democratic Party ticket.  He represented Milwaukee County's 5th Assembly district, which then comprised the 5th and 8th wards of the city.  He was not a candidate in 1870.  During this time he was a contractor on the construction of the Female College in Madison, Wisconsin, and Winnebago Mental Health Institute—then known as the "Northern State Hospital for the Insane"—in Oshkosh, Wisconsin.

He was elected to another term in 1871, after redistricting, in the new Milwaukee 8th Assembly district, which comprised just the 8th ward. He did not run again in 1872, but was an unsuccessful candidate in 1873.

He subsequently took on more important construction jobs in Wisconsin, including the 1875 Science Hall at the University of Wisconsin, which burned to the ground in 1884.  He worked on the Notre Dame Convent, St. Joseph's Hospital, as well as several churches, schools, and a Jewish temple.

He was elected to his final term in the Assembly in 1882.

He died on December 16, 1896, in Milwaukee, Wisconsin.

Personal life and family
John Fellenz was the eldest of at least six children born to Johann "Peter" Fellenz and his wife Anna Margaretha ( Feiten).  His younger brother, Joseph, remained in Washington County, Wisconsin.  Joseph's grandson, Louis J. Fellenz, Sr., and great-grandson, Louis J. Fellenz, Jr., both served in the Wisconsin State Senate in the 20th century.

John Fellenz married Anna Katharina Ruhland, another German immigrant, at Menomonee Falls, Wisconsin, on February 6, 1855.  They had at least nine children, though at least two died young.  Their son Frank Fellenz became a successful businessman in Milwaukee.

Electoral history

Wisconsin Assembly (1871)

| colspan="6" style="text-align:center;background-color: #e9e9e9;"| General Election, November 7, 1871

Wisconsin Assembly (1873)

| colspan="6" style="text-align:center;background-color: #e9e9e9;"| General Election, November 4, 1873

Wisconsin Assembly (1882)

| colspan="6" style="text-align:center;background-color: #e9e9e9;"| General Election, November 7, 1882

References

German emigrants to the United States
Politicians from Milwaukee
Wisconsin Reformers (19th century)
1833 births
1896 deaths
19th-century American politicians
Democratic Party members of the Wisconsin State Assembly